William Goldsack (1871–1957) was an Australian Baptist Missionary Society missionary to East Bengal (present day Bangladesh), India.

He authored several books like Christ in Islam, Muhammad in Islam, and chiefly notable for undertaking the translation of Quran, spelt also as Koran, into Bengali language.

Missionary work

Goldsack joined the Australian Baptist Missionary Society in 1899 where he mastered languages before being placed at mission station Pabna, East Bengal. At Pabna, he devoted his missionary work to preaching and teaching; additionally, he purchased the land for mission to erect new Zenana house. Having influenced by George Henry Rouse, head of the Baptist Mission Press at Calcutta, West Bengal, he devoted himself to the Islamic studies and literary work; thus, he wrote many apologetic tracts and pamphlets. In 1908 he undertook the translation of Quran or Koran into Bengali language.

In 1911, having attended the Lucknow Conference of Missionaries to Muslims, he was elected to the continuation committee. Between 1917 and 1918 he learnt Arabic language at missionary stations in Syria for six months, and later six months in Cairo, Egypt. Not being comfortable with district duties of Australian Baptist Missionary Society, he got himself transferred to British Baptist Missionary Society in 1912, during his furlough.

British Baptist Missionary Society designated his services exclusively for Muslim work in 1914. While serving as the secretary of the Christian Literature Society of Bengal branch, he rendered Quran in Bengali language in 1918, and later published collection of Muslim traditions in Bengali language in 1923. Many religious scholars, do believe that it was a bold and strategic venture on literary lines, and also had great effect on intelligent Moslems—The Koran he produced had Christian comments along with explanation of difficult passages, seemingly to avoid mis-interpretations and lead Moslems to Christ.

He remained Christian all his life, although devoted all his missionary work in Islamic studies and literature for evangelizing Bengali Muslims. He retired from missionary service in 1923, due to Malaria and recurrent boils; later part of his life was spent in fruit farming in South Australia, along with his family.

Criticism

Bhai Girish Chandra Sen, member of Brahmo Samaj, was the first non-Muslim to translate whole Quran into Bengali; however, his translation did not contain any Arabic text, instead it had Bengali words. For instance, Allah has been translated as ISHSHAR, Jannah as SHORGO, Jahannam as NOROK, Ibadah as ARCHONA, and alike. Although, Bhai Girish's translation didn't contain any material that would hurt the feelings of Muslims, Goldsack's translation of Koran into Bengali has been denounced to have contained offensive remarks on Islam and Muhammad; therefore, Goldsack's translation seems to have been rejected by Muslims.

Works

 Christ in Islam, 1905.
 Muhammed in Islam, 1916.
 The Bible in Islam, 1922.
 Ghulam Jabbar's Renunciation: A Tale of Eastern Bengal.
 The Origins of the Qur'an.

References

External links
 
 THE MOSLEM WORLD - p.19
 A Study of the Fatwa by Rashid Rida on the Translation of the Qur’an
 Translations of the Koran - p.173
 Baptist Union Conference

1871 births
1957 deaths
Australian Baptist missionaries
Baptist missionaries in India
Baptist missionaries in Bangladesh
Australian expatriates in India
Translators of the Quran into Bengali